Ligation may refer to:

 Ligation (molecular biology), the covalent linking of two ends of DNA or RNA molecules
 Chemical ligation, the chemoselective condensation of unprotected peptides
 In medicine, the making of a ligature (tie)
 Tubal ligation, a method of female sterilization
 Rubber band ligation, a treatment for hemorrhoids
 In coordination chemistry, making a bond between a ligand and a Lewis acid
 In orthodontics, a method of attaching the archwires to the brackets
 KAHA Ligation
 Ligation-independent cloning
 Typographic ligature forming

pl:Ligacja